The Venerable Giles Thorne, DD (b Dorset 1595); d Bedford 25 June 1671) was an Anglican priest in England.

Thorne was educated at Balliol College, Oxford. He held livings at Dunstable, Northampton and Bedford Thorne was Archdeacon of Buckingham from 1660 until his death.

Previously a protégé of Bishop John Williams, Giles Thorne had been ejected from Oxford in 1631 by William Laud himself after preaching against altars from The Diary of Robert Woodford, 1637–1641

IN 30 Aug 1642 Parliament Committed Gyles Thorne to the Fleet (prison).

Notes 

1595 births
1671 deaths
Alumni of Balliol College, Oxford
Archdeacons of Buckingham
People from Dorset
17th-century English Anglican priests
HL/PO/JO/10/1/132 – The National Archives